Christ Church, (also known as the Church of the Open Door) is an Anglican church in Dehiwala-Mount Lavinia in Sri Lanka. It was consecrated on 16 February 1843. The four tombs within the church's graveyard have been formally recognised by the Government as archaeological protected monuments in Sri Lanka. The designation was declared on 6 June 2008 under the government Gazette number 1553.

History
According to the account of the historian Valentyn, the first reference to a church in Galkissa is in 1705 where it mentions about a church, roofed with tiles and built upon 10 masonry and 20 stone pillars with a wall of clay 3½ft high. The stone pillars which had used for the church are said to be brought from a temple at Pepiliyana. In 1803, during the British rule it is said that there was a church in Galkissa without a roof but with supporting pillars. At that time the country residence of Governor Sir Robert Brownrigg was with the proximity of the Church at Mount-Lavinia and he (the governor) evinced a personal interest to restore the church again in 1820. The consecration of the restored church was held on 16 February 1843 by the Bishop of Madras, George Spencer. The church which was mentioned during the British time period is believed to be the same church described by the historian Valentyn in 1705.

Christ Church, Galkissa is known as the only open door church in Sri Lanka. Since 1952 the door of the church is open for whole of the day and night.

See also
Christianity in Sri Lanka

References

Anglican church buildings in Sri Lanka
Churches in Colombo District
Churches completed in 1843
Archaeological protected monuments in Colombo District
British colonial architecture in Sri Lanka
19th-century churches in Sri Lanka